Gunk Baby is a literary fiction novel by Jamie Marina Lau. It is Lau's second novel after 2018's Pink Mountain on Locust Island.

Plot 
Leen is a 24-year-old entrepreneur who opens a ear-cleaning business inside an indoor mall. She joins a group of workers in the complex who plan pranks on their managers but begins to grow disillusioned as her new-found friends become more and more violent.

Development history 
Gunk Baby originated as an unpublished short story, with Lau starting work on the novel in earnest sometime in 2018. Lau began with an idea of the protagonist and developed the rest of the novel around her. In an interview with Our Culture, Lau described her intention with the novel to "write about the colonial experience."

Publication history 
Gunk Baby was first published on April 28, 2021 in Australia by Hachette. The Australian release was followed by a July 8, 2021 release in the United Kingdom by Weidenfeld & Nicolson. Gunk Baby was published in the United States on December 13, 2022 by Astra Publishing House.

Reception 
Gunk Baby received positive reception from critics upon its initial Australian release. Declan Fry, writing in The Guardian, described the book as "a dissociative meditation on a world that has come to feel increasingly cruel and meaningless" and praised Lau's prose. Cher Tan, in The Saturday Paper, noted that Lau's writing had a distinctive style reminiscent of Susan Choi and Ottessa Moshfegh. Upon the novel's release in the United States, Publishers Weekly wrote positively about the first half of the book but criticized the ending and pacing throughout. Kirkus Reviews described the book as "funny, bold, capacious, and more than a little exhausting."

References

External links 

 Gunk Baby at BookMarks
 Jamie Marina Lau

2022 novels
21st-century Australian novels
English-language novels
Hachette Book Group books